The Zubr class, Soviet designation Project 1232.2, (NATO reporting name "Pomornik") is a class of Soviet-designed air-cushioned landing craft (LCAC). The name "Zubr" is Russian for the European bison. This class of military hovercraft is, as of 2023 the world's largest hovercraft, with a standard full load displacement of 555 tons. The hovercraft was designed to sealift amphibious assault units (such as marines and tanks) from equipped/non-equipped vessels to non-equipped shores, as well as to transport and plant naval mines.

Ten Zubr-class hovercraft remain in service. There are two vessels in the Russian Navy and four with the Hellenic Navy. In 2009 China placed an order for four vessels from Ukraine as part of a deal worth 315 million USD. Two updated versions of the vessels were built by  Crimea's Feodosia Shipbuilding Company, followed by two advanced models of the surface warship.

The purchase in 2000 of HS Cephalonia (L 180) for the Hellenic Navy marked the first time a Soviet-designed naval craft had been built for a NATO member.

In June 2017 Russia announced the restarting of production of Zubr-class craft. Representatives from the Russian shipbuilding industry soon after responded by stating production could not possibly resume in 2018 and would only be possible by 2019–2021, refuting the government position. Representatives cited the lack of availability of and inability to mass-produce components, notably gas-turbine engines and reduction gears as the main obstacles.

NPO Saturn (ODK GT) and Turboros developed marine gas turbine engines M70FRU (D090), FR RU, M70FRU2 (DP/DM71) along M90FR, M75RU, E70RD8 and Elektrosila, AO Zvezda, Metallist, Samara and others developed redactors and gears.

History

Configuration

High strength and buoyancy is provided by a rectangular pontoon, the main load-carrying part of the ship's hull. The superstructure built on the pontoon is divided into three compartments with two longitudinal bulkheads: combat material compartment in the midsection fitted with tank ramps, and outboard sections housing main and auxiliary propulsion units, troop compartments, living quarters, and NBC protection systems. To improve working conditions in the battle stations, troop compartments and living quarters are fitted with air-conditioning and heating-systems, sound/heat-insulating coatings, and structures made of vibration damping materials. The ship provides normal conditions for the crew to make meals and rest.

Personnel are protected against the effects of weapons of mass destruction by airtight sealing of combat stations, crew and troop compartments, augmented with individual gas masks and protection suits. The ship is also protected from magnetic influence mines with an active system to compensate for the magnetic fields generated by the ship and transported materials. The central command post and MS-227 device compartments are strengthened with alloy armor.

The mainland Chinese have built their own version designated as Type 958.

Capacity
It can carry three main battle tanks (up to 150 tonnes), or ten armoured vehicles with 230 troops (up to 131 tonnes), or 8 armoured personnel carriers of total mass up to 115 tonnes, or 8 amphibious tanks or up to 500 troops (with 360 troops in the cargo compartment).

At full displacement the ship is capable of negotiating up to 5-degree gradients on non-equipped shores and -high vertical walls. The Zubr class remains seaworthy in conditions up to Sea State 4.

Later models built by Ukroboronprom for the mainland Chinese are reported to travel at a top speed of 63 kt. The range of 300 nautical miles is obtained at 55 kt cruise. China has licensed a version of this model which it calls the Type 958.

Operators

 (ex-Soviet Navy) (2)
 770 Evgeniy Kocheshkov (former MDK-50)
 782 Mordoviya (former MDK-94)

 (2 + 2)
 HS Cephalonia (L 180, former MDK-118)
 HS Ithaca (L 181, former U421)
 HS Corfu (L 182)
 HS Zakynthos (L 183)

 (4: 2 delivered from Ukraine, 2 built in China)

Former operators 
 (4)
 Donetsk (U420, former MDK-100) — decommissioned on 11 June 1999, scrapped
 Kramatorsk (U422, former MDK-57) — decommissioned on 11 June 1999, scrapped
 Horlivka (U423, former MDK-93) — decommissioned on 29 November 2000, scrapped
 Artemivsk (U424, former MDK-123) — sold to Greece on 24 January 2000

See also
 List of ships of the Soviet Navy
 List of ships of Russia by project number

References

Bibliography

External links

 
 
 
 
 
 

Amphibious warfare vessels of the Soviet Navy
Amphibious warfare vessels of the Russian Navy
Amphibious warfare vessels of the Hellenic Navy
Hovercraft
Military hovercraft
Landing craft
Amphibious warfare vessel classes
Ships of the People's Liberation Army Navy